Greg Anthony (born June 5, 1981), is an American professional wrestler, booker, columnist, and wrestling historian. He has wrestled for the National Wrestling Alliance as well as former WWE developmental territory, Memphis Championship Wrestling.

Early life 
Greg was born in Centralia, IL and his family lived in Salem, IL until April 1988 when his family relocated to Dyersburg, TN.

Professional wrestling career 

Greg Anthony started his career with WWE developmental territory, Memphis Championship Wrestling. Once MCW closed, he earned a spot with NWA Mid South, where he won the NWA Southern Junior Heavyweight Championship.

Over the next several years, Greg racked up titles all over Tennessee, Arkansas and Missouri living up to his moniker of The Golden Boy.

Midnight Gold 
In 2009, "Beautiful" Bobby Eaton moved to Arkansas and was looking for a young talent to team with. Greg Anthony was handpicked by Bobby and his manager Brian Thompson to form the team Midnight Gold. Over the next 2 years they main evented across the south and won many tag titles along the way.

Traditional Championship Wrestling 
Midnight Gold (Greg Anthony & Bobby Eaton) along with their manager, entered TCW with a lot of fanfare. Once Bobby Eaton retired from in ring competition, Greg continued his singles career becoming a 3 Time and the inaugural TCW World Junior Heavyweight Champion. He also become a 3 Time TCW International Heavyweight Champion and a 2 Time TCW World Tag Team Champion (with tag partner Matt Riviera) making him a Triple Crown Champion.

National Wrestling Alliance 
Greg Anthony has worked off and on with the National Wrestling Alliance for years. He is a former 3 Time NWA National Heavyweight Champion, a former NWA Southern Heavyweight Champion, a former 4 time NWA Southern Junior Heavyweight Champion, former 2 time NWA Lonestar Tag Team Champion with Matt Riviera, and former 7 time NWA Mid South Heavyweight Champion.

Championships and accomplishments 

 NWA Elite Championship Wrestling
 NWA ECW Tag Team Championship (1 Time) - with Matt Riviera
 NWA Lonestar
 NWA Lonestar Tag Team Championships (2 times) – with Matt Riviera
 NWA Mid South
 NWA Mid South Heavyweight Championship (7 Times)
 NWA National Heavyweight Championship (3 Times)
 NWA Southern Heavyweight Championship
 NWA Southern Junior Heavyweight Championship (4 Times)
 Traditional Championship Wrestling
 TCW International Heavyweight Championship (3 Times)
 TCW World Tag Team Championships, (2 times) – with Matt Riviera
 TCW World Junior Heavyweight Championship (3 Times)

References 

1981 births
American male professional wrestlers
Living people